Nontoxic nodular goiter is an enlarged thyroid without hyperthyroidism. It is often present for years before toxic nodular goiter occurs. In the United States it is the most common cause of a large thyroid affecting between 3 and 5% of the population.

References

External links 

Thyroid disease